Moadab is a surname. Notable people with the surname include:

Ali Mohammad Moadab (born 1977), Iranian poet
Elias Moadab (1916–1952), Egyptian comedy actor